Early placenta insulin-like peptide is a protein that in humans is encoded by the INSL4 gene.

INSL4 encodes the insulin-like 4 protein, a member of the insulin superfamily. INSL4 encodes a precursor that undergoes post-translational cleavage to produce 3 polypeptide chains, A-C, that form tertiary structures composed of either all three chains, or just the A and B chains. Expression of INSL4 products occurs within the early placental cytotrophoblast and syncytiotrophoblast.

References

Further reading